The City of London (Ward Elections) Act 2002 was an act passed by the United Kingdom Parliament on 7 November 2002. Whereas throughout the rest of the United Kingdom the business vote had been abolished, in the City of London this act not only retained it but greatly increased it, so that it came to outnumber the residential vote.

Historical background
The Municipal Corporations Act 1835 was part of the reform programme brought in by the Whigs and following Reform Act 1832. Whereas his had abolished most of the rotten boroughs for parliamentary purposes, the 1835 Act applied the similar reforms in terms of local government to 178 boroughs. Over the next fifty years various unreformed boroughs were affected by successive pieces of legislation. However none of these affected the City of London Corporation. When the local government of London was reorganised by the London Government Act 1899, the City of London was again excluded. Likewise, the City of London was unaffected by the London Government Act 1963.

References

United Kingdom Acts of Parliament 2002
2002 in British law
Local government in South East England
City of London Corporation